Kasey Perry-Glass (born October 12, 1987) is an American equestrian. She represented her country at the 2016 Summer Olympics.

References 

1987 births
Living people
American dressage riders
Sportspeople from Sacramento, California
American female equestrians
Equestrians at the 2016 Summer Olympics
Medalists at the 2016 Summer Olympics
Olympic bronze medalists for the United States in equestrian
21st-century American women